Bart Rowland (born April 11, 1977) is an American politician and a Republican member of the Kentucky House of Representatives representing District 21 since the February 7, 2012 special election to fill the vacancy caused by the resignation of Representative James Comer.

Education
Rowland attended Western Kentucky University.

Elections
2012 When District 53 Representative James Comer resigned and left the seat vacant, Rowland won the February 7, 2012 Special election with 2,699 votes (%) against Democratic candidate Barry Steele.
Rowland won the three-way May 22, 2012 Republican Primary with 2,965 votes (60.9%) and won the November 6, 2012 General election with 10,688 votes (69.0%) against Democratic nominee Thomas Dodson.

References

External links
Official page at the Kentucky General Assembly

Bart Rowland at Ballotpedia
Bart Rowland at OpenSecrets

Place of birth missing (living people)
1977 births
Living people
Republican Party members of the Kentucky House of Representatives
People from Tompkinsville, Kentucky
Western Kentucky University alumni
21st-century American politicians